Kampong Pasai is a village in Brunei-Muara District, Brunei. The population was 2,204 in 2016. It is one of the villages within Mukim Sengkurong. The postcode is BG1221.

References 

Pasai